Spondylus linguafelis, the cat's tongue oyster, is a species of bivalve mollusc within the family Spondylidae. Its distribution covers parts of the Indian and Pacific Ocean near areas Australia, Hawaii, Guam, and the Philippines in reef environments at depths up to 25 meters. It can grow up to 91 millimeters in length.

References 

Bivalves described in 1847
Spondylidae
Bivalves of Australia
Molluscs of the Pacific Ocean
Molluscs of the Indian Ocean